Calcareous is an adjective meaning "mostly or partly composed of calcium carbonate", in other words, containing lime or being chalky. The term is  used in a wide variety of scientific disciplines.

In zoology
Calcareous is used as an adjectival term applied to anatomical structures which are made primarily of calcium carbonate, in animals such as gastropods, i.e., snails, specifically in relation to such structures as the operculum, the clausilium, and the love dart. The term also applies to the calcium carbonate tests of, often, more-or-less microscopic Foraminifera. Not all tests are calcareous; diatoms and radiolaria have siliceous tests.

The molluscs are calcareous organisms, as are the calcareous sponges (Calcarea), that have spicules which are made of calcium carbonate.

In botany

Calcareous grassland is a form of grassland characteristic of soils containing much calcium carbonate from underlying chalk or limestone rock.

In medicine
The term is used in pathology, for example in calcareous conjunctivitis, and when referring to calcareous metastasis or calcareous deposits, which may both be removed surgically.

In geology

The term calcareous can be applied to a sediment, sedimentary rock, or soil type which is formed from, or contains a high proportion of, calcium carbonate in the form of calcite or aragonite.

Marine sediments
Calcareous sediments are usually deposited in shallow water near land, since the carbonate is precipitated by marine organisms that need land-derived nutrients. Generally speaking, the farther from land sediments fall, the less calcareous they are. Some areas can have interbedded calcareous sediments due to storms, or changes in ocean currents.

Calcareous ooze is a form of calcium carbonate derived from planktonic organisms that accumulates on the sea floor. This can only occur if the ocean is shallower than the carbonate compensation depth (CCD). Below this depth, calcium carbonate begins to dissolve in the ocean, and only non-calcareous sediments are stable, such as siliceous ooze or pelagic red clay.

Calcareous soils
Calcareous soils are relatively alkaline, in other words they have a high pH. This is because of the very weak acidity of carbonic acid. Note that this is not the only reason for a high soil pH. They are characterized by the presence of calcium carbonate in the parent material and may have a calcic horizon, a layer of secondary accumulation of carbonates (usually calcium or Mg) in excess of 15% calcium carbonate equivalent and at least 5% more carbonate than an underlying layer.

List of calcareous rivers
 Ganga

Man made deposits

Calcareous deposits can form in water pipes. An example of this is Sunday stone.

In electrochemistry
Calcareous coatings, or calcareous deposits, are mixtures of calcium carbonate and magnesium hydroxide that are deposited on cathodically protected surfaces because of the increased pH adjacent to the surface.

References

Sedimentary rocks
Soil chemistry